Jiggs and Maggie in Court is a 1948 American comedy film directed by William Beaudine and starring Joe Yule, Renie Riano and George McManus. It was the second of a series of four films featuring Yule and Riano as the title characters, in a spin-off from the 1946 film Bringing Up Father.

Plot
Angry at being pointed out in the street by people who recognize her cartoon, Maggie takes the cartoonist to court to try to force him to stop drawing her.

Cast

References

External links

American comedy films
American black-and-white films
1948 comedy films
Films based on American comics
Films based on comic strips
Films directed by William Beaudine
Live-action films based on comics
Monogram Pictures films
Bringing Up Father